Nothoscordum is a genus of New World plants in the onion tribe within the Amaryllis family. It is probably paraphyletic. The genus is native to North and South America, though a few species have become naturalized in various parts of the Old World.

Taxonomy

Species 
The Plant List lists 87 species, although other authorities suggest only 20.

 Nothoscordum achalense Ravenna - Córdoba in Argentina

 Nothoscordum albitractum Ravenna - Jujuy in Argentina
 Nothoscordum altillanense Ravenna & Biurrun - La Rioja in Argentina
 Nothoscordum andicola Kunth - Peru, Bolivia, northern Chile, northern Argentina
 Nothoscordum andinum (Poepp.) Kunth ex Fuentes - Mendoza + San Juan in Argentina, central Chile
 Nothoscordum aparadense Ravenna - Santa Catarina in Brazil
 Nothoscordum arenarium Herter - northern Argentina, Uruguay
 Nothoscordum auratum Ravenna - Uruguay
 Nothoscordum bahiense Ravenna - Bahia in Brazil
 Nothoscordum balaenense Ravenna - Uruguay
 Nothoscordum basalticum Ravenna - Corrientes in Argentina
 Nothoscordum bivalve (L.) Britton in N.L.Britton & A.Brown - southern half of United States from California to Virginia, Mexico, Colombia, Peru, Argentina, Chile, Uruguay
 Nothoscordum boliviense Ravenna - Bolivia, northern Argentina
 Nothoscordum bonariense (Pers.) Beauverd - northern Argentina, Uruguay, southern Brazil
 Nothoscordum × borbonicum Kunth - northern Argentina (N. entrerianum × N. gracile)
 Nothoscordum calcaense Ravenna - Peru
 Nothoscordum calderense Ravenna - Salta in Argentina
 Nothoscordum cambarense Ravenna - Rio Grande do Sul in Brazil
 Nothoscordum capivarinum Ravenna - Paraná in Brazil
 Nothoscordum carambolense Ravenna - Corrientes in Argentina
 Nothoscordum catharinense Ravenna - Santa Catarina in Brazil
 Nothoscordum clevelandicum Ravenna - Paraná in Brazil
 Nothoscordum collinum Ravenna - Rio Grande do Sul in Brazil 
 Nothoscordum conostylum Ravenna - Entre Ríos in Argentina
 Nothoscordum correntinum Ravenna - Corrientes in Argentina
 Nothoscordum curvipes Ravenna - Paraná in Brazil
 Nothoscordum cuyanum Ravenna - San Juan + Mendoza in Argentina
 Nothoscordum demissum Ravenna - Cusco in Peru
 Nothoscordum dynamiandrum Ravenna - Jujuy in Argentina
 Nothoscordum empedradense Ravenna - Corrientes in Argentina
 Nothoscordum entrerianum Ravenna - Entre Ríos in Argentina
 Nothoscordum exile Ravenna - Paraná in Brazil
 Nothoscordum famatinense Ravenna - La Rioja in Argentina
 Nothoscordum gaudichaudianum Kunth - Uruguay, Entre Ríos in Argentina
 Nothoscordum glareosum Ravenna - Corrientes in Argentina
 Nothoscordum gracile (Aiton) Stearn - widespread from southern Mexico to Chile; naturalized in southeastern United States, California, and scattered locations in Europe, Asia, Africa, Australia, and various oceanic islands
 Nothoscordum gracilipes Ravenna - southern Brazil
 Nothoscordum ibiramense Ravenna - Santa Catarina in southern Brazil
 Nothoscordum ineanum Ravenna - Chaco in Argentina
 Nothoscordum inundatum Ravenna - Corrientes in Argentina
 Nothoscordum ipacarainum Ravenna - Paraguay
 Nothoscordum itatiense Ravenna - Corrientes in Argentina
 Nothoscordum izaguirreae Crosa - Uruguay
 Nothoscordum jaibanum Ravenna - Minas Gerais in Brazil
 Nothoscordum leptogynum Ravenna - Rio Grande do Sul in Brazil
 Nothoscordum luteomajus Ravenna - Paraná in Brazil
 Nothoscordum luteominus Ravenna - Buenos Aires Province in Argentina
 Nothoscordum macrantherum (Kuntze) Beauverd - Paraguay
 Nothoscordum mahui Traub - Santiago Region in Chile
 Nothoscordum moconense Ravenna - Misiones in Argentina
 Nothoscordum modestum Ravenna - Paraguay
 Nothoscordum montevidense Beauverd - Uruguay, northern Argentina, southern Brazil
 Nothoscordum nublense Ravenna - Biobío in Chile
 Nothoscordum nudicaule (Lehm.) Guagl. - Uruguay, Bolivia, Argentina, southern Brazil
 Nothoscordum nudum Beauverd -  Uruguay, Entre Ríos in Argentina
 Nothoscordum nutans Ravenna - Paraná in Brazil
 Nothoscordum pachyrhizum Ravenna - Uruguay
 Nothoscordum paradoxum Ravenna - Uruguay
 Nothoscordum patricium Ravenna - Corrientes in Argentina
 Nothoscordum pedersenii Ravenna - Corrientes in Argentina
 Nothoscordum pernambucanum Ravenna - eastern Brazil
 Nothoscordum planifolium Ravenna - Uruguay
 Nothoscordum portoalegrense Ravenna - Rio Grande do Sul in Brazil
 Nothoscordum pulchellum Kunth - central Brazil
 Nothoscordum punillense Ravenna - Córdoba + San Luis in Argentina
 Nothoscordum rigidiscapum Ravenna - Uruguay
 Nothoscordum saltense Ravenna - Salta + Catamarca in Argentina
 Nothoscordum scabridulum Beauverd - Uruguay
 Nothoscordum sengesianum Ravenna - Uruguay
 Nothoscordum serenense Ravenna - Coquimbo in Chile
 Nothoscordum setaceum (Baker) Ravenna - Uruguay
 Nothoscordum stenandrum Ravenna - southern Brazil
 Nothoscordum subtile Ravenna - Uruguay
 Nothoscordum tafiense Ravenna - Tucumán in Argentina
 Nothoscordum tarijanum Ravenna - Bolivia, Jujuy in Argentina
 Nothoscordum tenuifolium Ravenna - Entre Ríos in Argentina
 Nothoscordum tibaginum Ravenna - southern Brazil
 Nothoscordum tricostatum Ravenna - Jujuy in Argentina
 Nothoscordum tuyutiense Ravenna - Corrientes in Argentina
 Nothoscordum umburucuyanum Ravenna - Corrientes in Argentina
 Nothoscordum uruguaianum Ravenna - northern Argentina, southern Brazil
 Nothoscordum velazcoense Ravenna - La Rioja in Argentina
 Nothoscordum vernum Phil. - central Chile
 Nothoscordum vigilense Ravenna - Jujuy in Argentina
 Nothoscordum vittatum (Griseb.) Ravenna - Uruguay, northern Argentina, southern Brazil
 Nothoscordum yalaense Ravenna - Jujuy in Argentina
 Nothoscordum yatainum Ravenna - Corrientes in Argentina

formerly included
Several species names have been coined using the nameNothoscordum referring to species now regarded as better suited to other genera (Allium Beauverdia Oziroe Tristagma). We provide links to help you find appropriate information.

References

Bibliography 

 
 

Amaryllidaceae genera
Allioideae
Flora of South America